John Herbert (May 17, 1929January 26, 2011) was a Brazilian actor, director and producer.

Herbert was born John Herbert Buckup in São Paulo.  He appeared in numerous soap operas and telenovelas for Globo TV, making his last appearance in the 2008 series, Três Irmãs.

Herbert died from complications of pulmonary emphysema in São Paulo on January 26, 2011, at the age of 81. He had been hospitalized for the condition since January 5, 2011. Herbert was survived by his wife, Claudia Librach, and their two children. He had previously been married to Brazilian actress Eva Wilma, with whom he had two children, Vivian and John Jr.

Selected filmography

 A Flea on the Scales (1953) - Alberto
 Candinho (1954) - Quincas
 O Petróleo é Nosso (1954) - Sílvio
 Floradas na Serra (1954) - Flávio
 Matar ou Correr (1954) - Bill
 A Outra Face do Homem (1954)
 Rio Fantasia (1956) - Carlos
 Escravos do Amor das Amazonas (1957) - Hotel Desk Clerk
 Dioguinho (1957)
 E O Espetáculo Continua (1958) - Renato
 Alegria de Viver (1958) - Gilberto
 A Grande Vedete (1958) - Paulo
 Maria 38 (1959) - Chico
 A Moça do Quarto 13 (Girl in Room 13) (1960) - Police Captain
 Por Um Céu de Liberdade (1961)
 Assassinato em Copacabana (1962) - Humberto
 Copacabana Palace (1962)
 Gimba, Presidente dos Valentes (1963) - Repórter
 Mulher Satânica (1964)
 Toda Donzela Tem Um Pai Que É Uma Fera (1966) - Porfírio
 As Cariocas (1966) - Cid
 O Caso dos Irmãos Naves (1967) - Defense lawyer
 Bebel, Garota Propaganda (1968) - Marcos
 Helga und die Männer - Die sexuelle Revolution (1969) - Carlos
 O Cangaceiro Sanguinário (1969) - Cisso
 Corisco, O Diabo Loiro (1969) - Bem-te-vi
 O Palácio dos Anjos (1970) - Carlos Eduardo
 Em Cada Coração um Punhal (1970) - (segments "Transplante de Mãe" and "O Filho da Televisão")
 Cleo e Daniel (1970) - Rudolf Fluegel
 A Guerra dos Pelados (1970)
 A Arte de Amar Bem (1970) - Iseu (segment "A Garçonière de Meu Marido")
 Capitão Bandeira Contra o Dr. Moura Brasil (1971)
 Nem Santa Nem Donzela (1973)
 A Super Fêmea (1973)
 As Delícias da Vida (1974) - Esteves
 O Sexo Mora ao Lado (1975) - João
 Cada um Dá o que Tem (1975) - Otávio (segment "Cartão de Crédito")
 O Quarto da Viúva (1976)
 Já Não Se Faz Amor Como Antigamente (1976) - Macedo (segment "Noivo, O") and Alvaro (segment "Flor de Lys")
 Meus Homens, Meus Amores (1978)
 A Santa Donzela (1978)
 O Bem Dotado - O Homem de Itu (1978) - Himself
 O Caçador de Esmeraldas (1979)
 Ariella (1980) - Diogo
 O Inseto do Amor (1980) - Aristocrata Moura
 O Gosto do Pecado (1980) - Enéas
 Bacanal (1980)
 O Torturador (1981)
 Tessa, a Gata (1982)
 Retrato Falado de uma Mulher Sem Pudor (1982) - Johnny Gravatinha
 Deu Veado na Cabeça (1982)
 As Aventuras de Mário Fofoca (1982)
 Amor de Perversão (1982)
 Jeitosa, Um Assunto Muito Particular (1984)
 Os Bons Tempos Voltaram, Vamos Gozar Outra Vez (1985) - Fernando (segment "Sábado Quente")
 Made in Brazil (1985) - (segment "Um Milagre Brasileiro")
 As Sete Vampiras (1986) - Rogério
 A Menina do Lado (1987) - Padrasto de Alice / Alice's stepfather
 Per sempre (1991)
 Drama Urbano (1998)
 A Hora Mágica (1999) - Jorge
 Malhação (1995-2005, TV Series) - Nabuco / Horácio
 Onde Andará Dulce Veiga? (2008) - Apresentador de TV

References

External links

1929 births
2011 deaths
Brazilian male film actors
Brazilian male television actors
Brazilian male telenovela actors
Brazilian film producers
Brazilian people of German descent
Male actors from São Paulo
Deaths from emphysema